Since 1950, 143 known hurricanes, tropical storms and tropical depressions have affected the U.S. state of Maryland. Many of these storms also affect the country's capital, Washington, D.C., since the city is located on territory ceded by Maryland. Hurricanes are the most intense classification of these storms, while tropical storms and tropical depressions are generally weaker. The Delmarva Peninsula is often affected by cyclones   that brush the East Coast. Central and Western Maryland, as well as Washington, D.C., commonly receive rainfall from the remnants of storms that make landfall elsewhere and track northward. On rare occasions, the area experiences the effects of Pacific storms; one such example of this is Hurricane Tico, which made landfall on Mexico and moved inland.

Hurricane Agnes of the 1972 season was the deadliest storm, killing 19 people as a result of heavy flooding. The most damaging storm was Hurricane Irene, which resulted in $151 million in damage. No storms made landfall in Maryland at hurricane intensity. Since 1950, thirteen tropical cyclones have collectively killed 64 people.

Storms

1950–1959

September 9, 1950 – Outer moisture from Hurricane Dog drops heavy rainfall in the Mid-Atlantic. In Bel Air, a car drove into the swollen Gunpowder River; three people in the car drowned and a fourth was injured.
September 1, 1952 – Tropical Storm Able crosses the state, although damage, if any, is unknown.
October 15, 1954 – Hurricane Hazel crosses the state, producing hurricane-force winds. In addition to wind damage, flooding was severe along the Chesapeake Bay, while flash flooding was reported inland. Overall, six deaths and about $11 million in damage were reported.
August 12, 1955 – Tropical Storm Connie causes widespread damage, including where the storm's center passes directly over St. Mary's, Calvert, and Anne Arundel Counties. The rainfall leads to flooding which causes $2.5 million in damage. When the schooner Levin J. Marvel capsized in high seas, 14 people drown.
August 18, 1955 – As Tropical Storm Diane begins its turn to the east-northeast over Virginia, associated heavy rains, combined with saturated grounds from Connie just days before, cause flooding in central parts of the state, especially along the Potomac River.
September 19, 1955 – Hurricane Ione makes landfall in North Carolina; its outer moisture produces light rainfall across the state.
September 28, 1958 – Hurricane Helene remains well off of the Carolina coast, though light rain falls across the Mid-Atlantic states.
September 30, 1959 – The remnants of Hurricane Gracie drop moderate rainfall over western Maryland.

1960–1969
July 30, 1960 – Tropical Storm Brenda crosses southeastern Maryland. The storm's rainfall causes flooding in St. Mary's County.
Flooding along the eastern shore causes two deaths.
September 21, 1961 – Hurricane Esther moves northward, parallel to the coast.

September 1, 1964 – In Westernport,  of rain falls as Tropical Storm Cleo tracks just south of the state.
October 4, 1964 – The remnants of Hurricane Hilda cause light to moderate precipitation.
October 17, 1964 – The remnants of Hurricane Isbell drop light rainfall.
September 13, 1965 – The remnants of Hurricane Betsy produce light rainfall across western part of the state.
September 16, 1967 – Tropical Storm Doria makes landfall in Virginia; associated high seas damage the boardwalk at Ocean City.
June 13, 1968 – Tropical Depression Abby produces  of rainfall at Centreville.
June 26, 1968 – The remnants of Tropical Storm Candy drop moderate rainfall.
September 11, 1968 – Tropical Depression Fourteen produces  of rain near Parkton.
As a result, street flooding is reported in Ocean City.
September 9, 1969 – Hurricane Gerda intensifies offshore, prompting a hurricane watch for eastern Maryland. Because the storm remained offshore, only light precipitation falls.

1970–1979

August 28, 1971 – Tropical Storm Doria parallels the east coast, resulting in tides 2.7 feet (0.8 m) above normal in Fort McHenry.
September 13, 1971 – Tropical Storm Heidi passes offshore, dropping  of rain in parts of the state.
Early October 1971 – The remnants of Hurricane Ginger make landfall in North Carolina, turn north-northeast, and brush southern Maryland with light rainfall.
June 2, 1972 – Heavy rainfall from Tropical Storm Agnes, combined with a separate low to the west, contribute to the state's worst flooding in 36 years. Severe damage and at least 19 deaths are reported throughout the region. Throughout the state, 1,930 were damaged, of which 103 were destroyed. 17 farm buildings were destroyed and 44 damaged, and 82 small businesses were destroyed. Total damage is estimated at $80 million.
September 3, 1972 – Tropical Storm Carrie remains well offshore, though its outer bands drop light precipitation across the southern Delmarva Peninsula.
September 23–26, 1975 – Hurricane Eloise becomes an extratropical frontal low over Virginia. The storm's moisture drops  of rain in Westminster, causing severe flooding, particularly in the  Monocacy and Patapsco River basins.
October 27, 1975 – Tropical Storm Hallie becomes extratropical to the east of the state; light rain falls over the southern Delmarva Peninsula.
August 9, 1976 – Hurricane Belle parallels the east coast, prompting hurricane warnings for the coastline.
Mid-September 1976 – Subtropical Storm Three becomes extratropical to the south of the state. The resulting low moves northward, dropping moderate rainfall.
July 29–31, 1979 – The remnants of Tropical Storm Claudette drop light, spotty rainfall in southern areas.
Associated bands spawn seven tornadoes throughout the state. One of the tornadoes strikes near Crofton, causing tree and structure damage, as well as one injury.

1980–1989
 June 7, 1981 – A tropical depression moves off the Mid-Atlantic coast, brushing the southern tip of Maryland with light rainfall.
 July 1, 1981 – Tropical Storm Bret makes landfall on Maryland, although there is no reported damage.
 August 19, 1981 – Tropical Storm Dennis brushes the extreme southern section of the Delmarva Peninsula, with light rainfall.
 October 25, 1983 – The remnants of Hurricane Tico, a Pacific storm, drop light rainfall across Maryland and surrounding locations.

 July 25, 1985 – The remnants of Hurricane Bob cause moderate rainfall in southern Maryland, and light wind gusts. Rough seas from the system capsize a few boats along the Potomac River, and the rainfall collapses a house under construction in Great Falls, Maryland.
 September 24, 1985 – Tropical Storm Henri parallels the coastline, dropping light rainfall.
Wind gusts to  blast the coastline, causing beach erosion.
 August 28, 1988 – The state receives light rainfall caused by Tropical Storm Chris.
 Mid-October 1989 – The remnants of Hurricane Jerry track eastward off the Mid-Atlantic coast, dropping light amounts of rainfall in northern locales.

1990–1994
 Mid-October 1990 – The remnants of Tropical Storm Marco produce moderate rainfall in western locations.

Storm tide ranges from an estimated storm tide of 2–3 feet (0.6–0.9 m). The storm produces moderate rainfall of over 3 inches (76 mm) across the Eastern Shore of Maryland.
 September 1, 1993 – Uncertainty in the track of Hurricane Emily track prompts voluntary evacuations of Ocean City, although the storm quickly turns away from the state.
 July 21, 1994 – Tropical Depression Two passes just west of the western border with light precipitation.
 August 18, 1994 – Tropical Storm Beryl's remnants track over western Maryland, producing light rainfall.
 November 20, 1994 – Hurricane Gordon dissipates over South Carolina, dropping light to moderate rainfall over the southern Delmarva Peninsula.

1995–1999
 June 6, 1995 – The remnants of Hurricane Allison produce light showers in some locations, amounting to less than an inch.
 August 6, 1995 – Remnant moisture from Hurricane Erin produces  of rainfall in Chestertown.
 October 3, 1995 – The remnants of Hurricane Opal track well west of Maryland, producing light rainfall across the entire state. Moderate winds downed trees and tree limbs onto Maryland Route 495.

Several trees and power lines are downed resulting in scattered power outages and property damage. In Dorchester, one tornado is confirmed. Also, rainfall of up to  causes some street flooding.
Along the Chesapeake Bay, a storm surge of up to  inundates coastal communities. This causes tidal flooding which results in one injury and forces several people to evacuate. As a result of Fran, one death is reported, and $50 million (1996 USD, $68 million 2008 USD) in damage is blamed on the storm.
 October 8, 1996 – Moisture from Tropical Storm Josephine moves northward along the East Coast. The winds break loose a  barge from its moorings.
Because of a previous drought, there are no reports of flooding except for minor drainage ditch overflows.
 August 5, 1998 – The remnants of Hurricane Earl track south of the state, producing light rainfall on the Delmarva Peninsula.
 August 28, 1998 – Assateague Island reports  of rainfall from Hurricane Bonnie which tracks offshore in the Atlantic.
 September 4, 1999 – The remnants of Hurricane Dennis drop heavy rainfall which surpasses  and flooding. In Havre de Grace, four people were seriously injured when a car crossed the median and slammed into an oncoming vehicle, which is blamed on heavy rainfall. Two or more lightning strikes leave over 6,700 people without power.

 September 15, 1999 – Hurricane Floyd parallels the shore of the Delmarva Peninsula as a tropical storm. Chestertown, reports a maximum rainfall total of 14 inches (350 mm), with other locales reporting similar values. Extreme river flooding causes moderate damage to bridges and roads, resulting in a damage toll of $7.9 million (1999 USD, $10 million 2008 USD) throughout the state. In addition, over 250,000 residents are without electricity because of high winds blowing down power lines. More than 28 people are forced to be rescued by boat as a result of severe flooding. Nine other people were from an apartment building near Great Mills. Two people are injured and one person is killed by carbon monoxide after losing power and running a generator inside their home. Also, a 12‑year-old boy is caught in flood waters and is swept a half mile (800 m) down a drainage ditch before being rescued and treated for hypothermia.

2000–2004
 June 16, 2001 – The weakening Tropical Storm Allison tracks northward along the U.S. East Coast, passing southeast of the state. Rainfall from Allison totaled to 7.5 inches (190 mm) in Denton, closing eleven roads and causing washouts on 41 others.
The winds damage tree limbs and caused power outages to 3,000 customers, although it was quickly restored.
 September 16, 2002 – The remnants of Tropical Storm Hanna brought light rainfall to the Eastern Shore.
 September 27, 2002 – As the remnants of Hurricane Isidore track northward through the Ohio Valley, it produces light to moderate showers in northern and central Maryland.
 October 11, 2002—Remnant moisture from Hurricane Kyle produces moderate rainfall, reaching  in Salisbury.

 July 3, 2003 – Rainfall peaking at  falls in association with the remnants of Tropical Storm Bill. In northern and central Dorchester County, several secondary roads are closed due to heavy rainfall and flooding.
 September 14, 2003 – The remnant moisture from Tropical Storm Henri produce light rainfall over the state.
 September 17, 2003 – Hurricane Isabel tracks south and west of the state, causing moderate to severe damage. Along the Eastern Shore, the hurricane produces a storm surge peaking at 8 feet (2.4 m) on the Chesapeake Bay side in Hoopers Island and 6.5 feet (2 m) on the Atlantic coast in Ocean City. Over 1.4 million people throughout the state lose electric power at some point during the storm. One death in Maryland is attributed to the hurricane, and over 200 injuries are reported. In all, damage is estimated at over $530 million (2003 USD, $621 million 2008 USD).
 August 3, 2004 – Hurricane Alex's outskirts affected several portions of the state with heavy rainfall. 6.05 in (154 mm) of rainfall was reported in Assateague Island.
 August 12, 2004 – Remnant moisture from Tropical Storm Bonnie drops light rainfall across portions of the state.
 August 14, 2004 – The weakening Tropical Storm Charley drops rainfall across portions of the state. In Assateague Island, total rainfall was reported at 2.21 in (56 mm).
 August 30, 2004 – Hurricane Gaston tracks east of the state, producing light rainfall along the eastern shore.
The system also results in several tornadoes, one of which is reported to have killed an elderly woman and her daughter when a tree fell on their home in Cecil County.
 September 28, 2004 – The remnants of Hurricane Jeanne spawn a waterspout which moves ashore as a tornado and damages a visitor center, tearing part of the roof off the structure and landing it on Maryland Route 2. In total over 50 roads were closed due to flooding, and a group of inmates were rescued from the roof of a security van.

2005–2009
The rainfall causes flooding in some locations, leaving numerous roads underwater, and flooding several basements.
 July 9, 2005 – The remnants of Hurricane Dennis produce widespread light rainfall across much of the state.
 August 31, 2005 – The remnants of Hurricane Katrina produce light rainfall across western portions of the state. Rainfall peaked at 2.30 in (58 mm) in Thurmont.
Dozens of roads are flooded and closed, and about 30 people are forced from their homes. Damage is estimated at $200,000 (2005 USD, $220,000 2008 USD).
 October 24, 2005 – A nor'easter fed by Hurricane Wilma brought heavy rain, wind, and snow to the state. Dozens of schools were closed and 12 inches of snow fell in western Maryland.
 June 14, 2006—The remnants of Tropical Storm Alberto drop light rainfall in southern locations.
 September 1–2, 2006 – High winds and heavy rainfall from Hurricane Ernesto leaves 44,000 homes without electric power, mostly in low-lying areas of southern locations and on the eastern shore. Several basements in Anne Arundel County are forced to be pumped out due to flooding.
 June 3, 2007 – Tropical Storm Barry produces light rainfall over eastern portions of the state, peaking at  near Columbia.
 September 15, 2007 – The remnants of Hurricane Humberto dropped  light rainfall in extreme southern locations.
 August 28, 2008 – The remnants of Tropical Storm Fay brought light rainfall to extreme western portions of the state. 2.98 in (75 mm) of rainfall was reported in Pinto.
 September 6, 2008 – Tropical Storm Hanna moved over the area from the south, dropping over 4 inches of rain in parts of Maryland and producing wind gusts to 50 MPH in Southern Maryland.
 November 10–14, 2009 – The remnants of Hurricane Ida contribute to the emergence of an extratropical cyclone that brought heavy rainfall and gusty winds to the state. 7.40 in (188 mm) of rain fell in Assateague Island. This storm would later be known as the November 2009 Mid-Atlantic nor'easter.

2010–2014
 September 3, 2010 – Hurricane Earl skimmed the coast of North Carolina and moved northeastward, resulting in heavy rain and tropical storm force winds in Southeastern Maryland, near Ocean City. Areas inland were not affected by Earl.
 September 30, 2010 – The remnants of Tropical Storm Nicole produced massive amounts of rainfall across the state. Baltimore–Washington International Airport reported 6.02 in (153 mm) of total rainfall in 24 hours. Two transit buses collided during the storm, injuring 26 people.
 August 27, 2011 – Hurricane Irene did  not make direct landfall, but due to the large size, hurricane conditions were felt to the east of the Chesapeake Bay and tropical storm conditions were felt as far inland as Frederick, Maryland. Along the Delmarva Peninsula, sustained winds of 60 mph with gusts up to 85 mph and over a foot of rain fell over the area. There was also a five-foot storm surge that inundated regions around Ocean City, Maryland. The beach was evacuated prior to the storm; due to the minimal damage, it reopened the next day on Sunday and residents and tourists were allowed to return. In Central Maryland, sustained winds of 30-40 mph and 3-5 inches of rain fell. Gusts of up to 65 mph toppled many power lines. Most of the damage was from falling trees, which blocked roads, crushed power lines, and toppled onto houses. Power was out for over 200,000 people in Maryland; however, by Sunday, most power was restored.
 September 7–10, 2011 – The remnants of Tropical Storm Lee move across Maryland, causing widespread flooding, particularly in the central portion of the state. In combination with Hurricane Irene, The National Weather Service reported rainfall totals in Prince George's County at 24.13 in (613 mm) in Largo, 23.98 in (609 mm) in Forestville, and 21.49 in (546 mm) in Forest Heights.
 May 30, 2012 – Moisture from Tropical Storm Beryl affects the state.
 September 1–3, 2012 – The remnants of Hurricane Isaac brought light rainfall to the state.
 October 29, 2012 – Hurricane Sandy makes landfall north of the state. However, due to the tremendous size of the storm, its effects were felt all over Maryland. During the peak of the storm, 60 mph sustained winds were felt from Frederick, Maryland eastward. However, power outages were not widespread and any problems were solved quickly due to better preparation. Heavy rain affected the state, with up to a foot of rain falling in some spots. Storm surge was also a large factor along the beaches, washing out many piers and some boardwalks along Ocean City. Hurricane Sandy is the deadliest tropical cyclone to affect the state, causing 11 deaths.
 June 7, 2013 – Rain bands from Tropical Storm Andrea cause minor flooding in the Baltimore-Washington area and parts of the Eastern Shore, with rainfall totals of just over 2 in (51 mm) in Annapolis and Baltimore-Washington International Airport, both in Anne Arundel County. Andrea was a post-tropical system by the time the center moved over St. Mary's County and the lower Eastern Shore, which was under a tornado watch at the time due to the system's history of producing tornadoes.
 October 9–12, 2013 – The remnants of Tropical Storm Karen brought heavy rainfall to the state.
 July 4, 2014 – Hurricane Arthur's outskirts brought heavy rain and wind gusts in excess of 40 mph to areas such as Ocean City and Salisbury. Areas further inland were not impacted by the storm.
 August 28, 2014 – Hurricane Cristobal passes offshore, killing a swimmer in Ocean City. The Coast Guard also rescued three people after their 17-foot boat overturned.
 September 17, 2014 – Hurricane Edouard passes well offshore, but strong rip currents result in two deaths off the coast of Ocean City.

2015–2019
 May 11, 2015 – Tropical Storm Ana skimmed the Eastern Shore and brought gentle light rainfall to the area.
 June 20, 2015 – The remnants of Tropical Storm Bill brought heavy rainfall, thunderstorms, and gusty winds to the state. A tornado touched down in Tuscarora, but caused no damage.
 October 28, 2015 – The remnants of Hurricane Patricia brought rainfall to western portions of the state.
 May 29–30, 2016 – Tropical moisture from Tropical Storm Bonnie brought widespread rainfall across the state.
 September 3, 2016 – Tropical Storm Hermine affected the majority of the Eastern Shore with heavy rainfall and high winds, prompting tropical storm warnings to be put up. Governor Larry Hogan also declared a state of emergency for several counties along the Eastern Shore. Winds gusted well over 40 mph in Ocean City, Maryland.
 September 19–22, 2016 – A combination of the remnants of Tropical Storm Julia and a cold front brought rainfall to the state.
 October 8–9, 2016 – While Hurricane Matthew did not make landfall in the state, the storm still brought rain and gusty winds to the state due to its large size. A maximum rainfall total of 5.52 in (140 mm) was reported in Berlin. A wind gust of 49 mph was reported in Ocean City as well.
 June 23–24, 2017 – The remnants of Tropical Storm Cindy brought rainfall to the entire state.
 September 2, 2017 – The remnants of Hurricane Harvey brought heavy rain, thunderstorms and gusty winds to the state.
 September 12-14, 2017 - The remnants of Hurricane Irma affect portions of the state.
 September 19, 2017 – Hurricane Jose passes offshore, which brought showers, gusty winds and high rip currents to the Eastern Shore. The storm brought heavy winds and rain to Ocean City, Maryland on September 19, with large waves and strong currents flooding a parking lot at the Ocean City Inlet.
 October 8, 2017 – The remnants of Hurricane Nate affect the state.
 October 29, 2017 – Tropical Storm Philippe is absorbed by a non-tropical area of low pressure, which brought heavy rainfall and high winds to the state. Snow also fell in extreme western portions.
 September 8, 2018 – The remnants of Tropical Storm Gordon are absorbed by a large front. The new system brings rainfall on the state for several days.
 September 14, 2018 – Hurricane Florence tracks south of the state, with its outer bands bringing rain and gusty winds to the state. Large swells ahead of the hurricane reached Assateague State Park, Maryland, by September 9, prompting the Maryland Department of Natural Resources to close beach access indefinitely.
 October 11–12, 2018 – Tropical Storm Michael tracks inland, bringing heavy rainfall and gusty winds to the state.
October 26–27, 2018 – The remnants of Hurricane Willa brought rainfall and gusty winds to much of the state.
July 17, 2019 – The remnants of Hurricane Barry affect the state.
September 6, 2019 – Hurricane Dorian tracks southeast of the state, bringing heavy rainfall and high winds to the Eastern Shore in particular. Tropical Storm Warnings were put in place.
October 11, 2019 – Tropical Storm Melissa brings widespread flooding to the state. Flooding from increased high tides from the storm forced street closures in Crisfield and Salisbury.
October 20, 2019 – The remnants of Tropical Storm Nestor brings heavy rain and high winds to the state.

2020–present
May 18, 2020 – Tropical Storm Arthur brings rainfall to the Eastern Shore as it passes off the coast.
July 10, 2020 – Tropical Storm Fay impacts the state with heavy rainfall and wind.
August 4, 2020 – Hurricane Isaias tracks through the state as a tropical storm, spawning several tornadoes, high winds, heavy rainfall and thunderstorms. One person died while driving when a tree fell on their vehicle in St. Mary's County.
August 29, 2020 – The remnants of Hurricane Laura move across the state.
September 17, 2020 – The remnants of Hurricane Sally brings rainfall to the state.
October 11, 2020 – The remnants of Hurricane Delta affect the state with rainfall.
October 29, 2020 – Hurricane Zeta tracks inland as a tropical storm, bringing heavy rainfall and windy conditions to the state.
November 12, 2020 – The remnants of Hurricane Eta affect the state with massive flooding.
June 21, 2021 – The remnants of Tropical Storm Claudette brings showers to extreme southern portions of the state.
July 8–9, 2021 – Tropical Storm Elsa tracks inland, bringing heavy rain and winds to the state.
August 17-18, 2021 - The remnants of Tropical Storm Fred affect the state.
August 21, 2021 - The far outskirts of Hurricane Henri affect the Eastern Shore with rain and thunderstorms as it passes well offshore.
 September 1, 2021 - The remnants of Hurricane Ida brings heavy thunderstorms to the state. A tornado touched down in Hurlock. One man died in Rockville due to flooding. 
 September 30-October 5, 2022 - The remnants of Hurricane Ian affect the state with rain and wind for an extended period of time.
 November 11, 2022 - The remnants of Hurricane Nicole affect the state.

Climatological statistics

Deadly storms
The following table includes all storms since 1950 that have caused reported fatalities in Maryland and Washington, D.C.

References

External links

 Hurricanes and Maryland
 An Assessment Of Maryland's Vulnerability To Flood Damage
 Hurricanes' remnants often give Maryland problems

Maryland 1950
Maryland 1950
 1950
 Maryland 1950
Hurricanes 1950
Hurricanes 1950